Benoît Paire was the defending champion but lost in the semifinals to Andrey Rublev.

Julien Benneteau won the title after defeating Rublev 7–5, 2–6, 6–3 in the final.

Seeds

Draw

Finals

Top half

Bottom half

References
Main Draw
Qualifying Draw

Internationaux de Tennis de Vendee - Singles